The Climax is a horror film produced by Universal Pictures, first released in the United States in 1944. The credits state this is based on the 1909 play of the same name by Edward Locke, although the plot has little connection to Locke's play. Originally intended to be a sequel to Universal's remake of the Phantom of the Opera (1943), it featured new characters and a new plot.

Plot 
The physician at the Vienna Royal Theatre, Dr. Hohner (Karloff) murders his fiancée, a prima donna, out of obsession and jealousy. Ten years later, he hears another young singer (Foster) who reminds him of the late diva, and is determined to make her sing only for him, even if it means silencing her forever.

Cast 
 Boris Karloff as Dr. Friedrich Hohner
 Susanna Foster as Angela Klatt
 Turhan Bey as Franz Munzer
 Gale Sondergaard as Luise
 Thomas Gomez as Count Seebruck
 June Vincent as Marcellina
 George Dolenz as Amato Roselli
 Ludwig Stössel as Carl Baumann
 Jane Farrar as Jarmila Vadek
 Ernő Verebes as Brunn
 Lotte Stein as Mama Hinzl
 Scotty Beckett as The King
 William Edmunds as Leon, the theater concierge
 Maxwell Hayes as Count Romburg, the King's aide
 Dorothy Lawrence as Miss Metzger
 Francis Ford as Backstage Attendant (uncredited)

Production 
The film was originally conceived as a sequel to Phantom of the Opera (1943). The Climax was made using the sets of the Phantom of the Opera remake, which in turn used Universal's opera house set for the original Phantom of the Opera (1925). Choreography was by Lester Horton. The film was also nominated for an Academy Award in 1944 for Best Art Direction (John B. Goodman, Alexander Golitzen, Russell A. Gausman, Ira S. Webb).

Reception 
The Climax was a box office disappointment.

Home video release
This film, along with Night Key, Tower of London, The Strange Door and The Black Castle, was released on DVD in 2006 by Universal Studios as part of The Boris Karloff Collection.

In 2020, it was released in high definition as part of Scream Factory’s Universal Horror Collection, Vol. 4 blu ray set.

See also 
 List of American films of 1944
 Boris Karloff filmography

References

External links 

 
 

1940s historical horror films
1944 films
1944 horror films
American historical horror films
American films based on plays
Films directed by George Waggner
Films about opera
Films about physicians
Universal Pictures films
Films with screenplays by Curt Siodmak
Films set in the 1890s
Films set in Vienna
Films scored by Edward Ward (composer)
1940s American films